Bemesetron (MDL-72222) is a drug which acts as an antagonist at the 5HT3 receptor. It has antiemetic effects comparable to metoclopramide, however it is not used clinically, instead its main application is in scientific research studying the involvement of the 5HT3 receptor in the actions of drugs of abuse.

See also
Tropanserin
Tropisetron
Zatosetron
Ricasetron
Granisetron

References

5-HT3 antagonists
Tropanes
Benzoate esters
Chlorobenzenes
Glycine receptor agonists
Glycine receptor antagonists